The Politics of Bosnia and Herzegovina takes place in a framework of a parliamentary representative democracy, whereby executive power is exercised by the Council of Ministers of Bosnia and Herzegovina. Legislative power is vested in both the Council of Ministers and the Parliamentary Assembly of Bosnia and Herzegovina. Members of the Parliamentary Assembly are chosen according to a proportional representation system.

The judiciary is independent of the executive and the legislature. The system of government established by the Dayton Agreement is an example of consociationalism, as representation is by elites who represent the country's three major ethnic groups termed constituent peoples, with each having a guaranteed share of power.

Bosnia and Herzegovina is divided into two Entities – the Federation of Bosnia and Herzegovina and the Republika Srpska, which are politically autonomous to an extent, as well as the Brčko District, which is jointly administered by both. The Entities have their own constitutions.

Dayton Agreement

Due to the Dayton Agreement, signed on 14 December 1995, Bosnia and Herzegovina forms an undeclared protectorate with elements of hegemony by neighboring Croatia and Serbia as co-signatories to the Agreement, where highest power is given to the High Representative for Bosnia and Herzegovina. The intention of the Agreement was to retain Bosnia's exterior border, while creating a joint multi-ethnic and democratic government based on proportional representation similar to the former socialist system, and charged with conducting foreign, economic, and fiscal policy.

The Dayton Agreement established the Office of the High Representative (OHR) to oversee the implementation of the civilian aspects of the agreement. About 250 international and 450 local staff members are employed by the OHR.

High Representative

The highest political authority in the country is the High Representative for Bosnia and Herzegovina, the chief executive officer for the international civilian presence in the country. The High Representative has power to remove government officials, including court justices, local government members, members of parliament, etc. From its establishment, the Office of the High Representative has sacked 192 Bosnian officials. The mandate of the High Representatives derives from the Dayton Agreement, as confirmed by the Peace Implementation Council (PIC), a body with a Steering Board composed of representatives of Canada, France, Germany, Italy, Japan, Russia, the United Kingdom, the United States, the presidency of the European Union, the European Commission, and the Organisation of Islamic Cooperation. The Peace Implementation Council has established several criteria for the OHR to be closed, two of which have been completed but must be sustained until all five are completed.

Due to the vast powers of the High Representative over Bosnian politics and essential veto powers, the position has also been compared to that of a viceroy.

Executive branch

The Chair of the Presidency of Bosnia and Herzegovina rotates amongst three members (a Bosniak, a Serb, and a Croat) every 8 months within their 4-year term. The three members of the Presidency are elected directly by the people, with Federation voters electing both the Bosniak and the Croat member, and Republika Srpska voters electing the Serb member. The Presidency serves as a collective head of state. The Presidency is mainly responsible for the foreign policy and proposing the budget.

The Prime Minister, formally titled Chairman of the Council of Ministers of Bosnia and Herzegovina, is nominated by the Presidency and approved by the House of Representatives. They appoint the Minister of Foreign Affairs, the Minister of Foreign Trade and other ministers as may be appropriate (no more than two thirds of the ministers may be appointed from the territory of the Federation of Bosnia and Herzegovina), who assume the office upon the approval by the House of Representatives; also, the Chair appoints deputy ministers (who may not be from the same constituent people as their ministers), who assume the office upon the approval by the House of Representatives.

The Council is responsible for carrying out policies and decisions in the fields of diplomacy, economy, inter-entity relations and other matters as agreed by the entities.

The two Entities have Governments that deal with internal matters not dealt with by the Council of Ministers.

Principal Government Officials

History
Past international high representatives: Carl Bildt, Carlos Westendorp, Wolfgang Petritsch, Paddy Ashdown, Christian Schwarz-Schilling, Miroslav Lajčák, Valentin Inzko.

Members of the Presidency who stepped down under pressure from the Office of the High Representative: Mirko Šarović, Ante Jelavić, Dragan Čović. Alija Izetbegović also withdrew from the Presidency.

In February 2000, the Constitutional Court ruled that the structure of the Council of Ministers was unconstitutional; a new structure was negotiated.

Federation president and vice-president in 1999: Ejup Ganić and Ivo Andrić-Lužanski.

Past Republika Srpska presidents: Radovan Karadžić, Biljana Plavšić, Nikola Poplašen, Mirko Šarović, Dragan Čavić, Milan Jelić, Rajko Kuzmanović, Milorad Dodik.

Republika Srpska president Nikola Poplašen was removed by the OHR on 5 March 1999.

Legislative branch
The Parliamentary Assembly or Parliamentarna skupština is the main legislative body in Bosnia and Herzegovina. It consists of two chambers:
the House of Peoples or Dom naroda
the House of Representatives or Predstavnički dom/Zastupnički dom

The Parliamentary Assembly is responsible for:
enacting legislation as necessary to implement decisions of the Presidency or to carry out the responsibilities of the Assembly under the Constitution.
deciding upon the sources and amounts of revenues for the operations of the institutions of Bosnia and Herzegovina and international obligations of Bosnia and Herzegovina.
approving the budget for the institutions of Bosnia and Herzegovina.
deciding ratify treaties and agreements.
other matters as are necessary to carry out its duties of as are assigned to it by mutual agreement of the Entities.

Bosnia and Herzegovina did not have a permanent election law until 2001, during which time a draft law specified four-year terms for the state and first-order administrative division entity legislatures. The final election law was passed and publicized on 9 September 2001.

House of Peoples
The House of Peoples includes 15 delegates who serve two-year terms. Two-thirds of delegates come from the Federation (5 Croats and 5 Bosniaks) and one-third from the Republika Srpska (5 Serbs). Nine constitutes a quorum in the House of Peoples, provided that at least three delegates from each group are present. Federation representatives are selected by the House of Peoples of the Federation, which has 58 seats (17 Bosniaks, 17 Croats, 17 Serbs, 7 others), and whose members are delegated by cantonal assemblies to serve four-year terms. Republika Srpska representatives are selected by the 28-member Republika Srpska Council of Peoples, which was established in the National Assembly of Republika Srpska; each constituent people has eight delegates, while four delegates are representatives of "others".

House of Representatives
The House of Representatives comprises 42 members elected under a system of proportional representation (PR) for a four-year term. Two thirds of the members are elected from the Federation (14 Croats; 14 Bosniaks) and one third from the Republika Srpska (14 Serbs).

For the 2010 general election, voters in the Federation of Bosnia and Herzegovina elected twenty-one members in five multi-member constituencies by PR, while the remaining seven seats were allocated by compensatory PR. Voters in the Republika Srpska elected nine members in three multi-member constituencies by PR, while the five other seats were allocated by compensatory PR.

Political parties and elections

House of Representatives

Election history
National House of Representatives:
elections held 12–13 September 1998:
seats by party/coalition – KCD 17, HDZ-BiH 6, SDP-BiH 6, Sloga 4, SDS 4, SRS-RS 2, DNZ 1, NHI 1, RSRS 1
elections held 5 October 2002:
percent of vote by party/coalition - SDA 21.9%, SDS 14.0%, SBiH 10.5%, SDP 10.4%, SNSD 9.8%, HDZ 9.5%, PDP 4.6%, others 19.3%
seats by party/coalition – SDA 10, SDS 5, SBiH 6, SDP 4, SNSD 3, HDZ 5, PDP 2, others 7

House of Peoples:
constituted 4 December 1998
constituted in fall 2000
constituted in January 2003
next to be constituted in 2007

Federal House of Representatives:
elections held fall 1998:
seats by party/coalition – KCD 68, HDZ-BiH 28, SDP-BiH 25, NHI 4, DNZ 3, DSP 2, BPS 2, HSP 2, SPRS 2, BSP 1, KC 1, BOSS 1, HSS 1
elections held 5 October 2002:
seats by party/coalition – SDA 32, HDZ-BiH 16, SDP 15, SBiH 15, other 20

Federal House of Peoples:
constituted November 1998
constituted December 2002

Republika Srpska National Assembly:
elections held fall 1998
seats by party/coalition – SDS 19, KCD 15, SNS 12, SRS-RS 11, SPRS 10, SNSD 6, RSRS 3, SKRS 2, SDP 2, KKO 1, HDZ-BiH 1, NHI 1
elections held fall 2000
elections held 5 October 2002
seats by party/coalition – SDS 26, SNSD 19, PDP 9, SDA 6, SRS 4, SPRS 3, DNZ 3, SBiH 4, SDP 3, others 6

Judicial branch

Constitutional Court

The Constitutional Court of Bosnia and Herzegovina is the supreme, final arbiter of constitutional matters. The court is composed of nine members: four selected by the House of Representatives of the Federation, two by the National Assembly of Republika Srpska, and three are foreign citizens appointed by the President of the European Court of Human Rights after courtesy-consultation with the Presidency.

The initial term of appointee is 5 years, unless they resign or are removed by consensus of other judges. Appointed judges are not eligible for reappointment. Judges subsequently appointed will serve until the age of 70, unless they resign sooner or are removed. Appointments made 5 years into the initial appointments may be governed by a different regulation for selection, to be determined by the Parliamentary Assembly.

Proceedings of the Court are public, and decisions are published. Court rules are adopted by a majority in the Court. Court decisions are final and supposedly binding though this is not always the case, as noted.

The Constitutional Court has jurisdiction over deciding in constitutional disputes that arise between the Entities or amongst Bosnia and Herzegovina and an Entity or Entities. Such disputes may be referred only by a member of the Presidency, the Chair of the Council of Ministers, the Chair or Deputy Chair of either of the chambers of the Parliamentary Assembly, or by one-fourth of the legislature of either Entity.

The Court also has appellate jurisdiction within the territory of Bosnia and Herzegovina.

State Court
The Court of Bosnia and Herzegovina consists of three divisions – Administrative, Appellate and Criminal – having jurisdiction over cases related to the state-level law and executive, as well as appellate jurisdiction over cases initiated in the entities.

A War Crimes Chamber was introduced in January 2005, and has adopted two cases transferred from the ICTY, as well as dozens of war crimes cases originally initiated in cantonal courts.

The State Court also deals with organized crime, and economic crime including corruption cases. For example, the former member of the Presidency Dragan Čović was on trial for alleged involvement in organized crime.

Human Rights Chamber
The Human Rights Chamber for Bosnia and Herzegovina (Dom za ljudska prava za Bosnu i Hercegovinu) existed between March 1996 and 31 December 2003. It was a judicial body established under the Annex 6 of the General Framework Agreement for Peace in Bosnia and Herzegovina (Dayton Agreement).

Entities
The two Entities have Supreme Courts. Each entity also has a number of lower courts. There are 10 cantonal courts in the Federation, along with a number of municipal courts. The Republika Srpska has five municipal courts.

High Judicial and Prosecutorial Council
The High Judicial and Prosecutorial Council (JHPC / VSTV) is the self-regulatory body of the judiciary in the country, tasked with guaranteeing its independence. It is based on the continental tradition of self-management of the judiciary. It was formed in 2004.

See also
Constitution of Bosnia and Herzegovina

References

External links

Office of the High Representative
Election Commission of Bosnia and Herzegovina
Government of the Republic of Srpska
Government of the Federation of Bosnia and Herzegovina
Bosnia: a single country or an apple of discord?, Bosnian Institute, 12 May 2006
Bertelsmann Stiftung – Bosnia and Herzegovina Country Report
Balkaninsight – The future of Bosnia